T.W. Roland "Roly" Meates is a former Ireland national rugby union team coach and chairman of the Irish Rugby Football Union board of selectors.

Roly Meates studied dentistry at the University of Dublin, where he played as a forward with the Dublin University Football Club before moving to Wanderers. Meates coached Dublin University Football Club for 28 years, before moving to Leinster Rugby to coach for five years. He was Leinster's president in the 1968–1969 season. He became Ireland national rugby union team coach from 1975 to 1977 and later chairman of the selection board. He returned to Leinster where he worked with Matt Williams, and  currently works as scrummaging coach. He serves as a governor of The High School, Dublin, and Chairman of the Sports Committee.

References

External links
 The Scotsman "Meates rejects SRU spin to reveal why he turned down Williams" 7 August 2003
 Leinster Rugby bio of Meates

Living people
Year of birth missing (living people)
Irish rugby union coaches
Leinster Rugby non-playing staff
Dublin University Football Club players
Wanderers F.C. (rugby union) players
People educated at The High School, Dublin
Ireland national rugby union team coaches